Dicrolene tristis is a ray-finned fish species from the family of cusk eels from the western Pacific, from Japan south to the Philippines. It is a marine, bathydemersal species with a depth range . It os oviparous laying its eggs in a gelatinous floating mass.

References

Ophidiidae
Fish described in 1913